Gösüzce is a village in Bozyazı district of Mersin Province, Turkey. It is a coastal village situated on Turkish state highway , which connects Mersin to Antalya. The population of the village was 182. as of 2012. The main economic activity of the village is farming and the major crop is bananas.

References

Villages in Bozyazı District